The 1868 Wycombe by-election, was a parliamentary by-election held for the House of Commons constituency of the Wycombe in Buckinghamshire on 11 April 1868.

Vacancy
The by-election was caused by the elevation to the peerage of the sitting Liberal MP, the Hon. Charles Carington, on the death of his father.

Candidates
The outgoing MP's brother, the Hon. William Carington, was selected by the local Liberals to fight the seat. No other candidates were nominated.

The result
There being no other candidates putting themselves forward Carington was returned unopposed.

References

See also
List of United Kingdom by-elections 
United Kingdom by-election records
1978 Wycombe by-election

Unopposed by-elections to the Parliament of the United Kingdom in English constituencies
1868 elections in the United Kingdom
1868 in England
19th century in Buckinghamshire
By-elections to the Parliament of the United Kingdom in Buckinghamshire constituencies
April 1868 events